Orhidea Latifi (born 21 December 1997), known professionally as Kida, is a Kosovo-Albanian singer.

Life and career 

Kida was born as Orhidea Latifi on 21 December 1997 into an Albanian family in the city of Prishtine, then part of the FR Yugoslavia, present-day Kosovo. In July 2020, Latifi's singles "Paranoia" and "Pishmon" featuring Kosovo-Albanian rapper Mozzik reached number one in Albania and peaked at number 56 and 98 in Switzerland, respectively. Featuring pop and R&B music, her follow-up single "Drunk" peaked at number seven in her native country.

Kida released her debut studio album, Orchidé, on 21 December 2021. In June 2021, the albums's lead single "Lila" featuring German rapper Samra reached number ten in Albania and had peaked within the top 35 in Austria, Germany and Switzerland. The follow-up non-album release "Dale" with Kosovo-Albanian singers Butrint Imeri and Ledri Vula peaked at number one on the native Top 100 in July 2021.

Discography

Albums

Singles

As lead artist

References

External links 

1997 births
21st-century Albanian women singers
Albanian-language singers
Kosovan people of Albanian descent
Kosovan singers
Living people
People from Orahovac
Sony Music artists